Mishler is a surname first found in Baden. It is perhaps an occupational surname in origin, being derived from the Middle High German word "Mutze". Notable people with the surname include:

Floyd Mishler (1892–1973), American football coach and physical education advocate
Jacob Mishler (1911–2004), American federal judge
James Mishler (born 1969), American writer and editor
Jeffrey Allen Mishler (born 1956), known professionally as Jeff Allen, American comedian
Reese Mishler (born 1991), American actor 
Ryan Mishler (born 1968), American politician

See also
Mishler, Ohio
Mishler Theatre

Occupational surnames